Arjun is a 2011 ( Marathi अर्जुन ) Indian film released on 16 September 2011 by Cinematics. It was written, directed and produced by F. M. Ilyas along with A. M. Burondkar.

Plot 

A youth sets up his own business despite sociocultural and political issues that stand in his way.

Cast 
 Sachit Patil As Arjun
 Amruta Khanvilkar As Anushka
 Vidyadhar Joshi As Ratan Shah
 Vinay Apte As Jay Thackeray
 Varsha Usgaonkar As Maya Thackeray 
 Arun Nalawade As Bajirao
 Uday Tikekar As Mahajan
 Snigdha Sabnis As Arjun’s Mother
 Kamalesh Sawant As Police Officer
 Uday Sabnis As Advocate
 Anant Jog As Income Tax Officer 
 Mamata Soni As Dancer

Soundtrack 
The songs were composed by Lalit Sen.

Release 
Arjun is the first film to be screened at the Bombay Stock Exchange.

Reception

Awards 
 Best Supporting Actor 2011 Maharashtra State Film Awards
 Best Dialogues 2011 Maharashtra State Film Awards
 Best Singer (Female)2011 Maharashtra State Film Awards
 Best Choreographer 2011 Maharashtra State Film Awards
 Best Editing 2011 Maharashtra State Film Awards

Maharashtra Times: Mata Sanman 
 Best Choreographer

Zee Gaurav 
 Best Singer (Female)

Sanskruti Kaladarpan 
 Best Popular Film
 Best Choreographer

Sayadri Cine Awards

References

Sources
 BSE opens door to moviedom with Marathi language film, Arjun
 About ‘Sons of the soil’ (page 25 film review)
 अर्जुन येतोय...
 शहराकडे चला...
 नायक नही...

External links 
 

2011 films
Indian romantic drama films
2010s Marathi-language films
2011 romantic drama films